Chris Duncan, is an Australian Scottish Fiddle player. He was described by The Age's Anna King Murdoch as being one of the "two really great Scottish fiddle players in the world." His album Fyvies Embrace - The Golden Age of the Scottish Fiddle won the 2000 ARIA Award for Best World Music Album.

Discography

Albums

Awards and nominations

ARIA Music Awards
The ARIA Music Awards is an annual awards ceremony that recognises excellence, innovation, and achievement across all genres of Australian music. They commenced in 1987.

! 
|-
| 2000
| Fyvies Embrace - The Golden Age of the Scottish Fiddle
| ARIA Award for Best World Music Album
| 
| 
|-

References

External links
Chris Duncan and Catherine Strutt

Australian musicians
Living people
Year of birth missing (living people)
ARIA Award winners